Bas Leinders (born 16 July 1975) is a retired professional racing driver from Belgium. He is also a former British Formula Ford and German Formula Three champion, winning the titles in 1995 and 1998 respectively.

Career
Born in Bree, Leinders was one of the most successful Belgian racing drivers of the nineties and the beginning of the 21st century. He started his career in karting, winning his very first race. At the age of 14 he was already a European Champion beating Jarno Trulli, Ralph Firman and others. In 1992 Leinders was an official works driver for the Italian Tony Kart outfit.

Leinders started his automobile career with the Formula Ford. He was not only crowned Benelux Champion but he also obtained the pole position at the prestigious Formula Ford Festival at his first participation, later becoming European and British Formula Ford Champion. Not being able to gather enough money to make the step to Formula Three, Leinders decided on the European Formula Opel Championship (for Van Amersfoort Racing). With a record of 8 wins he secured the Championship several races before the end.

With some more backing he graduated to the German Formula 3 series with VAR. The Belgian finished 2nd in his maiden F3 weekend just behind Nick Heidfeld. In his second year, he won the Championship and was invited by the McLaren Junior team to partner Nick Heidfeld in the last race of the Formula 3000 season. Leinders obtained his best F3000 results in 2001, finishing second twice behind Tomáš Enge and Justin Wilson respectively.

In 2002 and 2003 Leinders competed in the World Series by Nissan, he finished third in the Championship on both occasions. His good performance in this series and especially winning the last race of the season gave him the opportunity to test with the Jordan F1 Team which resulted in a contract with the Minardi F1 Team as an official Friday Test and reserve driver in the 2004 FIA Formula One World Championship.

Leinders was pre-selected several times by journalists for the title "Belgian Sportsman of the Year". Leinders was crowned "Champion of Belgium" in 2001 by the Royal Automobile Club of Belgium, the award presented by Crown-prince of Belgium, Prince Philippe. The Belgian also won the Golden Helmet in 2004 for his performances in Formula One with the Minardi F1 Team.

From 2005, Leinders was a regular racer in the FIA GT Championship with Belgian Racing, driving a Belgian-built Gillet Vertigo. In 2011 he became the team principal of the rebranded Marc VDS Racing, which was also his last year as full-time driver.

In 2014, he ran the entire season of the NASCAR Whelen Euro Series with Marc VDS Racing's Toyota Camry in the Elite 1 category. He finished the season in 14th place in the standings with two Top 5 finishes, one at Brands Hatch and one at Le Mans.

After Marc VDS's victory in the 2015 24 Hours of Spa, Leinders announced he parted ways with the team.

In 2016, Leinders became sporting manager of the McLaren GT factory programme and team manager of Garage 59. In 2018 he joined Optimum Motorsport.

Leinders has also worked as color analyst at Formula One broadcasts on Telenet's Play Sports.

Racing record

Career summary

Career highlights
2014 NASCAR Whelen Euro Series – Marc VDS Racing Team
2010 FIA GT1 World Championship – Marc VDS Racing Team
2009 FIA GT Championship – Ford GT
2008 FIA GT Championship – Gillet Vertigo 1st G2
2007 FIA GT Championship – Gillet Vertigo 1st G2
2006 FIA GT Championship – Gillet Vertigo 1st G2
2005 FIA GT Championship – Gillet Vertigo – 3 class wins
2004 Formula One World Championship test driver in Minardi-Cosworth F1 Team. Did not participate in races
2003 3rd place – Superfund World Series – 2 wins.
2003 Winner TA Class 24 hours of Zolder in a BMW M3 GTR
2002 24 h of Spa in a Chrysler Viper GTS-R
2002 3rd place – Telefónica World Series – 2 wins .
2002 4th in 24 hours of Zolder in a BMW Z3
2001 Formula 3000 Championship – KTR 2-second places.
2000 Formula 3000 Championship – Kid Jensen Racing.
1999 Formula 3000 Championship – Witmeur Team KTR .
1999 3rd 24 hours of Spa
1998 German Formula 3 Champion
1998 2nd 24 hours of Zolder
1997 7th German Formula 3 Championship
1996 European Formula Opel Champion
1995 British and European Formula Ford Champion
1994 Benelux Formula Ford Champion
1992 Vice-European and Belgian Kart Champion
1991 Belgian Kart Champion
1990 European Kart Champion

Complete International Formula 3000 results
(key) (Races in bold indicate pole position) (Races in italics indicate fastest lap)

Complete Formula One participations
(key)

* Leinders was entered as Third Driver for Australia '04 but was refused a superlicence until he completed the required mileage in an F1 car.  He satisfied this requirement before the next race.

Complete GT1 World Championship results

24 Hours of Le Mans results

NASCAR
(key) (Bold – Pole position awarded by qualifying time. Italics – Pole position earned by points standings or practice time. * – Most laps led.)

Whelen Euro Series – Elite 1

References

External links
 
 

1975 births
Living people
People from Bree, Belgium
Belgian racing drivers
Formula Ford drivers
German Formula Three Championship drivers
FIA GT Championship drivers
Minardi Formula One drivers
International Formula 3000 drivers
FIA GT1 World Championship drivers
24 Hours of Le Mans drivers
FIA World Endurance Championship drivers
Blancpain Endurance Series drivers
24 Hours of Spa drivers
European Le Mans Series drivers
British GT Championship drivers
NASCAR drivers
Sportspeople from Limburg (Belgium)
West Competition drivers
Van Amersfoort Racing drivers
Racing Engineering drivers
OAK Racing drivers
KTR drivers
Nürburgring 24 Hours drivers